Sport of Kings is a 1947 American sports drama film directed by Robert Gordon and starring Paul Campbell, Gloria Henry and Harry Davenport. The film's sets were designed by the art director Charles Clague. Two young brothers move to Kentucky after inheriting their father's farm.

Cast
 Paul Campbell as Tom Cloud 
 Gloria Henry as Doc Richardson 
 Harry Davenport as Maj. Denning 
 Mark Dennis as Biff Cloud 
 Harry Cheshire as Theodore McKeogh 
 Clinton Rosemond as Josiah 
 Louis Mason as Bertie 
 Oscar O'Shea as Judge Sellers 
 Ernest Anderson as Alf 
 Eddy Chandler as Announcer 
 Johnny Duncan as Jockey
 Al Eben as Moving Man 
 Antonio Filauri as Barber
 Sam Flint as Chief Steward 
 Robert Emmett Keane as Dr. Craig 
 Michael Towne as Clerk 
 Eddy Waller as Perkins

References

Bibliography
 Goble, Alan. The Complete Index to Literary Sources in Film. Walter de Gruyter, 1999.

External links

1947 films
1940s sports films
American horse racing films
Columbia Pictures films
Films directed by Robert Gordon
American black-and-white films
Films set in Kentucky
1940s English-language films
1940s American films